Ernest Joseph Bellocq (1873–3 October 1949) was an American professional photographer who worked in New Orleans during the early 20th century. Bellocq is remembered for his haunting photographs of the prostitutes of Storyville, New Orleans' legalized red-light district. These have inspired novels, poems and films.

Life
Bellocq was born into a wealthy family of French créole origins in the French Quarter of New Orleans. He became known locally as an amateur photographer before setting himself up as a professional, making his living mostly by taking photographic records of landmarks and of ships and machinery for local companies. However, he also took personal photographs of the hidden side of local life, notably the opium dens in Chinatown and the prostitutes of Storyville. These were only known to a small number of his acquaintances. He had been something of a dandy in his early days, while he lived alone in the latter part of his life and acquired a reputation for eccentricity and unfriendliness. According to acquaintances from that period, he showed little interest in anything other than photography.

Bellocq died in 1949, and was buried in Saint Louis Cemetery No. 3 in New Orleans.

After his death, most of his negatives and prints were destroyed. However, the Storyville negatives were later found. After many years, they were purchased by a young photographer, Lee Friedlander. In 1970, a show of Friedlander's posthumous prints on gold tone printing out paper from Bellocq's 8" x 10" glass negatives were mounted by curator John Szarkowski at the Museum of Modern Art in Manhattan. A selection of the photographs were also published concurrently in the book, Storyville Portraits. These photographs were immediately acclaimed for their unique poignancy and beauty. A more extensive collection of Friedlander's prints, entitled Bellocq: Photographs from Storyville, was published with an introduction by Susan Sontag in 1996.

In recent times, a significant number of prints from Bellocq's own studio have come to light. They are typical professional photographs of the day, such as portraits, copy work for the Louisiana State Museum, and local views, yet few if any Storyville portraits printed by Bellocq's hand exist. A number of early posthumous prints from Bellocq's negatives by photographer Dan Leyrer have also surfaced.

The E. J. Bellocq Gallery of Photography at Louisiana Tech University is named in his honor.

The Storyville photographs
All the photographs are portraits of women. Some are nude, some dressed, others posed as if acting a mysterious narrative. Many of the negatives were badly damaged, in part deliberately, which encouraged speculation. Many of the faces had been scraped out; whether this was done by Bellocq, his Jesuit priest brother who inherited them after E. J.'s death or someone else is unknown. Bellocq is the most likely candidate, since the damage was done while the emulsion was still wet. In a few photographs the women wore masks.

Some prints made by Bellocq have since surfaced. These are far more conventional than the full-negative prints made by Friedlander.

The Storyville photographs not only serve as a record of the prostitutes, but also the interiors of the businesses that housed them.

Bellocq in literature and film
The mystique about Bellocq has inspired several fictional versions of his life, notably Louis Malle's 1978 film Pretty Baby, in which Bellocq was played by Keith Carradine. He also appears in Michael Ondaatje's novel Coming Through Slaughter and is a protagonist in Peter Everett's novel Bellocq's Women. These works take many liberties with the facts of Bellocq's life.

The photographs have inspired imaginative literature about the women in them. There are several collections of poems, notably Brooke Bergan's Storyville: A Hidden Mirror and Natasha Trethewey's Bellocq's Ophelia.

The 1974 book Storyville, New Orleans: Being an Authentic, Illustrated Account of the Notorious Red-Light District by Al Rose gives an overview of the history of prostitution in New Orleans with many photographs by Bellocq.

In 1971, Storyville Portraits won a mention at the Rencontres d'Arles's Book Award, France.

The 1983 novel Fat Tuesday by R. Wright Campbell features a thinly-veiled depiction of Bellocq, a photographer named B.E. Locque.

Bellocq appears as a fictional character in David Fulmer's Storyville novels Chasing the Devil's Tail and Rampart Street. He is also a character in Madam: A Novel of New Orleans by Cari Lynn and Kellie Martin.

Footnotes

External links  

 Masters of Photography

1873 births
1949 deaths
Artists from New Orleans
American portrait photographers
Louisiana Creole people